Davide Fabrizio Incerti (born 22 June 2002) is a Cuban footballer who plays as a midfielder for Italian  club Olbia.

Club career
Incerti started his career with Italian sixth division side Athletic Club Liberi. After that, he joined the youth academy of Genoa in the Italian Serie A. After that, Incerti joined the youth academy of Italian third division side Ternana.

For the 2021–22 season, he was loaned to Atletico Uri in the fourth-tier Serie D.

On 7 July 2022, Incerti signed with Olbia for one season.

International career
Incerti was born in Cuba to an Italian father and Cuban mother. He made his debut with the Cuba national team in a 5-0 2022 FIFA World Cup qualification win over British Virgin Islands on 2 June 2021.

References

External links
 

2002 births
Sportspeople from Havana
Cuban people of Italian descent
Living people
Cuban footballers
Cuba international footballers
Association football midfielders
Olbia Calcio 1905 players
Serie D players
Cuban expatriate footballers
Expatriate footballers in Italy
Cuban expatriate sportspeople in Italy
21st-century Cuban people